Lelooska Museum is a Native American Kwakwaka'wakw (Kwakiutl) cultural museum in Ariel, Washington, United States. It is operated by the Lelooska Foundation that was established in 1977. Collections include baskets, parfleches, corn husk bags, dolls, spoons, cradles, moccasins, tomahawks, pipes, pipe bags, dresses, a 15-foot birch bark canoe and a replica fur trade store.

The foundation operating the museum also sponsors living history programs and performances, conducts classes in woodcarving and other native skills, and demonstrations of dance and basket weaving.

Lelooska, for whom the foundation is named, was a master carver of totem poles, one of which is displayed at the Christchurch International Airport in New Zealand, and another at the Oregon Zoo.

References

External links

1977 establishments in Washington (state)
Kwakwaka'wakw
Museums established in 1977
Museums in Cowlitz County, Washington
Native American museums in Washington (state)